Patrick D'Silva is an Indian cell biologist, biochemist, and an associate professor at the Molecular Chaperone Lab of the Indian Institute of Science. He is known for his medical discoveries related to neurodegenerative diseases and cancer biology. The Department of Biotechnology of the Government of India awarded him the National Bioscience Award for Career Development, one of the highest Indian science awards, for his contributions to biosciences, in 2014.

Professional profile 

Patrick D'Silva serves as an associate professor at the Division of Biological Sciences of the Indian Institute of Science and heads the Molecular Chaperone Lab as its principal investigator. His research focus is on the cell biological aspects of neurodegenerative diseases such as Parkinson's disease and Alzheimer's disease as well as various cancers and his team is known to have made several breakthroughs in the treatment of such diseases. In 2015, D'Silva led a research which identified that Hsp31, a stress response chaperone, in Yeast provided abiotic stress tolerance to the fungus. On further studies, he found out that the chaperone acts as a detoxifier by removing a toxic metabolite named Methylglyoxal (MG) and regulates reactive oxygen species (ROS). This led to further investigations and DJ-1, a protein similar to Hsp31, helped to enhance natural detoxifiers such as glutathione (GSH) which in turn regulated the reactive oxygen species and this discovery promised to offer new ways in the management of some forms of Parkinson's disease.

Later, D'Silva and his team furthered their research and developed a metal oxide nanomaterial, which when introduced into humans, acted similar to three major cellular antioxidant enzymes which regulated the level of reactive oxygen species inside cells. This nanomaterial, made of vanadia, exhibited glutathione peroxidase enzyme activity, thus proving to be a nanozyme and it was the first time identification that all three major antioxidant enzymes in one nanozyme. This discovery is reported to have uses in drug development in cardiac disorders, and neurodegenrative diseases like Parkinson's and Alzheimer's disease. D'Silva's studies have been documented by way of a number of articles and ResearchGate, an online repository of scientific articles has listed 57 of them. He also hosts several post-doctoral and doctoral researchers at his laboratory.

Awards and honors 

The Department of Biotechnology (DBT) of the Government of India awarded him the National Bioscience Award for Career Development, one of the highest Indian science awards in 2014. In 2016, D'Silva received the CDRI Award for Excellence in Drug Research from the Central Drug Research Institute.

Selected bibliography

See also 

 Govindasamy Mugesh
 Artificial enzyme

Notes

References

External links 
 

N-BIOS Prize recipients
Indian scientific authors
Living people
Scientists from Karnataka
Indian medical writers
Year of birth missing (living people)
Indian cell biologists
Indian biochemists
Academic staff of the Indian Institute of Science
Indian medical researchers